The Little Truckee River is a  river that is a tributary to its larger counterpart, the Truckee River, located in Nevada County in eastern California.

Description
The Little Truckee River begins at Webber Lake within the Tahoe National Forest in the Sierra Nevada. The river flows in a general southeastern route to Stampede Reservoir, then Boca Reservoir, and terminates at its confluence with the Truckee River.

History
The Boca Dam was completed in 1939 during the Truckee Storage Project.

References

Rivers of Nevada County, California
Rivers of the Sierra Nevada in Nevada
Rivers of the Sierra Nevada in California
Rivers of Northern California
Rivers of the Great Basin
Rivers of the Sierra Nevada (United States)